The following is a list of Appalachian State Mountaineers men's basketball head coaches. The Mountaineers have had 22 coaches in their 103-season history.

Appalachian State's current head coach is Dustin Kerns. He was hired in March 2019 to replace Jim Fox, who was let go by Appalachian State at the end of the 2019 season.

References

Appalachian State

Appalachian State Mountaineers men's basketball coaches